Konstantin Adolfovic Semendyayev or Semendyaev (Russian: ,); born 9 December 1908 in Simferopol, died 15 November 1988) was a Russian engineer and applied mathematician. He worked in the department of applied mathematics of the Steklov Institute in Moscow. He carried out pioneering work in the area of numerical weather forecasting in Russia.

Work and life 
Semendyayev studied at the Lomonosov University with the degree in 1929 and was then at various higher schools. From 1931 to 1936 he was in the Faculty of Mathematics and Mechanics at Lomonosov University. He habilitated in 1940 (Russian doctorate). From 1936 he headed the Department of Mathematical Instruments of the USSR Academy of Sciences. He was evacuated to Kazan with the institute during World War II. After World War II, he headed a department for numerical calculations at the Steklov Institute in Moscow and, when the Institute for Applied Mathematics at the Steklov Institute was founded in 1953, his group became the Department of Gas Dynamics. In 1961, he became deputy head of the Institute for Applied Mathematics. In 1963, he went to the Hydrometeorological Center of the USSR, where he led the programming work. He also supported the teaching of applied mathematics at various Moscow educational institutions.

Semendyayev is known as the co-author of a handbook of mathematics for engineers and students of technical universities, which he wrote together with Ilya Nikolaevich Bronshtein around the 1939/1940 timeframe. Hot lead typesetting for the work had already started when the Siege of Leningrad prohibited further development and the print matrices were relocated. After the war, they were first considered lost, but could be found again years later, so that the first edition of  could finally be published in 1945. This was a major success and went through eleven editions in Russia and was translated into various languages, including German and English, until the publisher Nauka planned to replace it with a translation of the American Mathematical Handbook for Scientists and Engineers by Granino and Theresa M. Korn in 1968.
However, in a parallel development starting in 1970, the so called "Bronshtein and Semendyayev" (BS), which had been translated into German in 1958, underwent a major overhaul by a team of East-German authors around Günter Grosche, Viktor & Dorothea Ziegler (of University of Leipzig), to which Semendyayev contributed as well (a section on computer systems and numerical harmonic analysis). This was published in 1979 and spawned translations into many other languages as well, including a retranslation into Russian and an English edition. In 1986, the 13th Russian edition was published. The German 'Wende' and the later reunification led to considerable changes in the publishing environment in Germany between 1989 and 1991, which eventually resulted in two independent German publishing branches by Eberhard Zeidler (published 1995–2013) and by  & Heiner Mühlig (published 1992–2020) to expand and maintain the work up to the present, again with translations into many other languages including English.

Semendyayev has been on the editorial board of the Russian journal  since its inception.

He received the Order of Lenin, the USSR State Prize and the Order of the Red Banner of Labor.

Publications 
 With Bronshtein: "Handbook of Mathematics for Engineers and Students of Technical Universities" (Справочник по математике для инженеров и учащихся втузов), Moscow, 1945

See also 
 Bronshtein and Semendyayev (BS)
 Ilya Nikolaevich Bronshtein

References

Further reading 
 
 Volume 29, 1989, pp. 474–475, http://www.mathnet.ru/php/archive.phtml?wshow=paper&jrnid=zvmmf&paperid=3490&option_lang=rus
 https://web.archive.org/web/20200705112735/http://www.mathnet.ru/links/feea4ab25995d6344cb609e4dcfc8c88/zvmmf3490.pdf
 https://web.archive.org/web/20211019135410/https://keldysh.ru/memory/index1.htm Keldysh Institute of Applied Mathematics of the Russian Academy of Sciences, 2010

External links 
 

20th-century Russian mathematicians
Full Members of the USSR Academy of Sciences
Recipients of the Order of Lenin
Recipients of the USSR State Prize
Recipients of the Order of the Red Banner of Labour